Kalevi Kull (born 12 August 1952, Tartu) is a biosemiotics professor at the University of Tartu, Estonia.

He graduated from the University of Tartu in 1975. His earlier work dealt with ethology and field ecology. He has studied the mechanisms of species coexistence in species-rich communities and developed mathematical modelling in ecophysiology. Since 1975, he has been the main organiser of annual meetings of theoretical biology in Estonia. In 1992, he became a Professor of Ecophysiology in the University of Tartu. In 1997, he joined the Department of Semiotics, and became a Professor in Biosemiotics. From 2006 to 2018, he was the Head of the Department of Semiotics in the University of Tartu, Estonia. His field of interests include biosemiotics, ecosemiotics, general semiotics, theoretical biology, theory of evolution, history and philosophy of semiotics and life science.

He was the president of the Estonian Naturalists' Society in 1991–1994. He is the president of the International Society for Biosemiotic Studies since 2015.

Ecologist Olevi Kull was his younger brother.

Publications
Emmeche, Claus; Kull, Kalevi (eds.) (2011). Towards a Semiotic Biology: Life is the Action of Signs. London: Imperial College Press.

References

External links
Tartu University: Kalevi Kull
Publications List
Publications

1952 births
Living people
Estonian semioticians
Theoretical biologists
Estonian biologists
Academic staff of the University of Tartu
People from Tartu
Recipients of the Order of the White Star, 5th Class